The 1997 UMass Minutemen football team represented the University of Massachusetts Amherst in the 1997 NCAA Division I-AA football season as a member of the Atlantic 10 Conference.  The team was coached by Mike Hodges and played its home games at Warren McGuirk Alumni Stadium in Hadley, Massachusetts. It was Hodges' last as head coach, as he would take the position of assistant athletic director at the university in the offseason. The 1997 season was a tough one for the Minutemen as they stumbled to their worst record since 1953. UMass finished the season with a record of 2–9 overall and 1–7 in conference play.

Schedule

References

UMass
UMass Minutemen football seasons
UMass Minutemen football